The Linn Cove Viaduct is a  long, concrete segmental bridge which snakes around Grandfather Mountain in western North Carolina. Completed in 1983 at a cost of $10 million, it was one of the last major construction projects on the Blue Ridge Parkway which runs  linking Shenandoah National Park to Great Smoky Mountains National Park. Built mostly along the spine of the Blue Ridge, the parkway was fully completed and opened for through traffic in 1987.

History

Construction of the parkway began in 1935 with the initial plan calling for a viaduct given the effects that a traditional cut-and-fill road would have on Grandfather Mountain. Towering almost , this mountain is the highest and most rugged peak on the Blue Ridge and geologically the most ancient mountain on the North American continent. Conservationists who hoped to preserve the area as a mountain park/recreation area were behind the viaduct concept as they stressed the danger of irreparable damage by lumbering and other exploitation, along with the need to preserve the view of the mountain as it then existed. By 1966, the parkway was essentially complete except for the  section that circled around Grandfather Mountain despite the concerted efforts of the government to acquire the needed property, a task which eventually took 40 years.

Design and Construction

 
The viaduct was designed by Figg and Muller Engineers, Inc., with construction beginning in 1979. What made its construction noteworthy was keeping heavy construction equipment off the ground. This included the preliminary geotechnical exploration/evaluation work begun in 1975 where crews hiked to the site and drilling equipment was lowered to each bore-hole location by helicopter. Building the bridge from its south side, this was done by connecting 153 segments one at a time using a custom crane that moved along the viaduct as it was being built. All but one of these segments were slightly curved as the viaduct needed to be shaped in a "S-and-a-half" figure to follow the contours of the mountain. The only work done on the ground involved drilling the footings for the piers which also were built in a segmental manner. The viaduct has received numerous design awards to include the 1984 President's Design Award, which states, "... construction of the roadway by pre-cast, segmental concrete elements set from above on segmental piers is elegant, economical, and new… results in an elegant curving ribbon that caresses the terrain without using it as a support. It gives the motorist the sensation of driving tantalizing on air while the earth goes by."

Environs
The National Park Service operates the Linn Cove Visitor Center at the viaduct's south end which also features a bridge museum and provides access to the Tanawha Trail which runs from Beacon Heights to Julian Price Memorial Park.

See also
List of bridges documented by the Historic American Engineering Record in North Carolina

References

Further reading

External links

Linn Cove Viaduct – Blue Ridge Parkway Association

Historic American Engineering Record in North Carolina
Landmarks in North Carolina
Bridges completed in 1987
Viaducts in the United States
Blue Ridge Parkway
Road bridges in North Carolina
Buildings and structures in Avery County, North Carolina
Concrete bridges in the United States